= See All =

Mountain in West Virginia, United States

Coordinates: 38.2487330°N 79.9328364°W

See All is a summit in West Virginia, in the United States. With an elevation of 3,166 feet (965 m), See All is the 294th highest summit in the state of West Virginia.

The etymology is See All is uncertain; it may be so named for the mountain scenery, or the name may be derived from the name Sewell.
